Chris (Christine) Beasley is an Australian researcher whose interdisciplinary work crosses the fields of social and political theory, gender and sexuality studies and cultural studies. She is Emerita Professor in the Department of Politics and International Relations, University of Adelaide. She is an elected Fellow of the Australian Academy of Social Sciences.
In 2018, Beasley was named the leading researcher in feminism and women's studies in Australia based on major journal publications in the field.
Beasley was the founder and inaugural co-Director of the Fay Gale Centre from 2009 to 2013.

In 2014 and 2015, she was Guest Professor, Centre for Gender Studies Karlstad University.

In 1994, Beasley was awarded the Stephen Cole the Elder Prize for Teaching.

One of Beasley's major intellectual contributions has been to explore possibilities for, and barriers to, dialogue across the sub-fields of gender studies: feminism, masculinity studies and sexuality studies. Beasley has brought attention to the ‘potential disjunctions’ that arise as a result of the different ‘theoretical frameworks or paradigms’ that shape the overall agendas of masculinity studies and feminist scholarship. Her work on the use of feminist theory in masculinities research has seen her described as ‘the most articulate critic on this point [in] arguing that men and masculinities researchers tend to set up “awkward couplings”  between structuralist and poststructuralist traditions...’

Beasley is also known in the masculinity studies field through her critical yet supportive engagement with the work of Professor Emerita Raewyn Connell.

In the field of feminist scholarship Beasley is known for her work on care. Beasley has shown that care is used as a resistant framework in arguments against individualization that work towards diverse political agendas – including some that connect to feminist agendas. While recognizing these connections Beasley also warns of the ethical limits of care as the basis of a resistant politics, highlighting the ‘moral and asymmetrical relationship [that] is constructed between those needing care and those delivering care, undermining the egalitarian potential of the terminology.’

Beasley has collaborated with Professor Emerita Carol Bacchi and together they have postulated the notion of 'social flesh' as a means to challenge the atomistic individualism that frequently underpins understandings of the human subject in political philosophy.

Beasley has also published research on the cultural politics of film, including a 2019 book with co-author Heather Brook.

Beasley has a BA, Dip Ed, M Ed, MA and PhD from Flinders University, South Australia, and MA from Birmingham University, UK.

Selected publications 
C. Beasley and H. Brook, The Cultural Politics of Hollywood Film: Power, Culture and Society, Manchester University Press, 2019

R. Harding, R. Fletcher and C. Beasley eds, Revaluing Care in Theory, Law & Policy: Cycles and Connections, Routledge, Oxfordshire, UK, 2017

C. Beasley et al., Heterosexuality in Theory and Practice, Routledge Advances in Feminist Studies and Intersectionality Series, London & NY, 2012

A. Bletsas and C. Beasley eds, Engaging with Carol Bacchi: Strategic Interventions and Exchanges, University of Adelaide Press, 2012

C. Beasley, Gender & Sexuality: Critical Theories, Critical Thinkers, Sage, London & Thousand Oaks, Ca., 2005

C. Beasley, What is Feminism?: An Introduction to Feminist Theory, Sage, London & Thousand Oaks, Ca., 1999 (also published as What is Feminism, anyway?: Understanding Contemporary Feminist Thought, Allen & Unwin, Sydney, 1999

C. Beasley, Sexual Economyths: Conceiving a Feminist Economics, Allen and Unwin, Sydney, 1994

References 

Living people
Year of birth missing (living people)
Academic staff of the University of Adelaide
Australian political scientists
Women political scientists
Fellows of the Academy of the Social Sciences in Australia